Zick may refer to:

Surname
A family of German artists:
Johann Martin Zick (1684–1753)
Johann Zick (1702–1762)
Januarius Johann Rasso Zick (1730–1797)
Carl Zick (fl. )
Conrad Zick (1773–1836)
Gustav Zick(1809–1886)
Alexander Zick (1845–1907)
Bob Zick (born 1927) American professional baseball player

Nickname
Zick, nickname for Isaac
Zick Rubin (born 1944), American psychologist and lawyer

Fiction
Ezekiel Zick, character from the comic book and animated series, Monster Allergy

See also
Zicker (disambiguation)
Zickhusen